Blair Farm is a historic farm located near Boone, Watauga County, North Carolina, United States.  The original section of the Blair House was built in 1844, with additions and modifications made in the 1850s, 1880s, about 1900, 1938, and in the late 1950s-early 1960s. It is a 1½-story single-pile, side-gable-roofed, timber-frame dwelling with a full-height rear-gabled ell.  Other contributing buildings are a granary / wood shed and carriage house. The house is the oldest of only a few 19th-century buildings remaining in Boone.

It was listed on the National Register of Historic Places in 2008.

References

Farms on the National Register of Historic Places in North Carolina
Houses completed in 1844
Buildings and structures in Watauga County, North Carolina
National Register of Historic Places in Watauga County, North Carolina